The Maryland Terrapins women's basketball team represents the University of Maryland in National Collegiate Athletic Association Division I competition. Maryland, a founding member of the Atlantic Coast Conference (ACC), left the ACC in 2014 to join the Big Ten Conference. The program won the 2006 NCAA Division I women's basketball tournament championship and has appeared in the NCAA Final Four five times (1982, 1989, 2006, 2014, 2015); Maryland also appeared once in the AIAW Final Four (1978). As members of the ACC, the Terrapins won regular season conference championships (1979, 1982, 1988, 1989, 2009) and an ACC-record ten conference tournament championships (1978, 1979, 1981, 1982, 1983, 1986, 1988, 1989, 2009, 2012). The program won the Big Ten Conference regular season and tournament championships in 2015, 2016, 2017, 2020, and 2021.

Since 2002, the team has been led by head coach Brenda Frese. Over her 20 season tenure, she has led the Terrapins to 17 NCAA tournament appearances, ten NCAA Sweet Sixteens, six NCAA Elite Eight, three NCAA Final Fours, and the 2006 NCAA National Championship.

History
Women's basketball was first organized to play on campus in 1923. The early teams participated solely in intracollegiate competition, with classes or sororities competing against each other for a trophy. The team was officially recognized as a varsity sport in 1971, and was led by coach Dottie McKnight during its first four seasons. The Terps were successful from the start, winning their first state championship in the 1972–73 season. They went on to win ten ACC championships and one NCAA title.

On January 26, 1975, the Terps played host to Immaculata in the first nationally televised women's college basketball game. The game took place in Cole Field House. Some sources report that Immaculata won 80–48, while others report 85–63.  On March 9, 2019, Maryland won its 1000th game, becoming the 14th (unsure, based on 2017 data) team to win 1000 games.  It did so at home against Michigan in the Big Ten Semifinals, which it won by a score of 73-72.

The team has been led by three head coaches: Dottie McKnight (1971–1975), Chris Weller (1975–2002), and Brenda Frese (2002–present). Although McKnight only coached four seasons of Terps basketball, she quickly led her new team to success. She left with a record of 44–17 (.721). Weller, a University of Maryland alumna ('66) and former Terps player, took over the head coaching position in 1975. She led the Terps to numerous national championship appearances and a total of eight ACC championship titles. When she retired, Weller left with a 499–286 record (.636). At the end of the 2018–19 season, current coach Brenda Frese has a record of 458–124 (.787). She has also led her team to a national championship title, eight national championship appearances, and two conference championship titles. Frese is known for her recruiting skills, with Shay Doron being credited as her first major recruit.

Notable players
Many Terps have gone on to national prominence, appearing in the Olympics and playing in professional leagues.
Vicky Bullett, Olympian in 1988 and 1992; played in Italy for Bari (1990–93) and Cesena (1993–97), in Brazil for the Data Control/Fluminense professional team, and for the WNBA's Charlotte Sting (1997–1999) and Washington Mystics (2000–02)
Sonia Chase, played for the WNBA's Charlotte Sting (1998–99)
Marissa Coleman, played for the WNBA's Washington Mystics (2009–11), Los Angeles Sparks (2012–2013) and Indiana Fever (2014–present)
Katrina Colleton, played for the WNBA's Los Angeles Sparks (1997–1998) and Miami SOL (2000–2001)
Shay Doron, played for the WNBA's New York Liberty (2007–2008), the Romanian League's Municipal MCM Târgovişte (2010), and the Israeli leagues' Elitzur Ramla (2007–08, 2010–present)
Kelley Gibson, played for the WNBA's Houston Comets (2000–03)
Lea Hakala, Olympian in 1984 (Finnish team)
Laura Harper, played for the WNBA's Sacramento Monarchs (2008–09)
Tianna Hawkins, played for the WNBA's Seattle Storm (2013) and Washington Mystics (2014–present)
Tara Heiss, Olympian in 1980
Jessie Hicks, played for the WNBA's Utah Starzz (1997–98), Orlando Miracle (2000–02), Connecticut Sun (2003), and San Antonio Silver Stars (2004)
Kris Kirchner, Olympian in 1980
Crystal Langhorne, played for the WNBA's Washington Mystics (2008–2013) and Seattle Storm 2014–present
Limor Mizrachi, played for the ABL's New England Blizzard (1998)
Jasmina Perazić, Olympian in 1984 (Yugoslavian team); played for the WNBA's New York Liberty (1997)
Deanna Tate, played for the ABL's New England Blizzard (1997–1998) and the Chicago Condors (1998)
Alyssa Thomas, played for the WNBA's Connecticut Sun (2014–present)
Kristi Toliver, played for the WNBA's Chicago Sky (2009), Los Angeles Sparks (2010–2016) and Washington Mystics (2017–present)

2007–08 season

Head coach Brenda Frese announced during the pre-season that she was pregnant. Because of this, she was unable to coach from the sidelines for most of the regular season. Newcomer assistant coach Daron Park would take on the role of acting head coach. With the coaching changes, the Terps improved to a 30–3 record, and ranked 5 and 6 in the AP and Coaches polls respectively. Key returning players include Marissa Coleman, Laura Harper, Crystal Langhorne, and Kristi Toliver, all of whom were on the 2006 NCAA Championship team. With the loss of Shay Doron, whose #22 jersey was honored this season, Frese brought in 5 recruits. Two weeks after giving birth to twin boys, Frese returned to the sidelines during the ACC women's basketball tournament. Maryland eventually lost to Duke in the semifinals.

Coaching staff

Year by year results

|-style="background: #ffffdd;"
| colspan="8" align="center" | Atlantic Coast Conference

|-style="background: #ffffdd;"
| colspan="8" align="center" | Big Ten Conference

Postseason results

NCAA Division I

AIAW Division I
The Terrapins made four appearances in the AIAW National Division I basketball tournament, with a combined record of 13–1.

See also
University of Maryland, College Park
Maryland Terrapins
Big Ten Conference
Xfinity Center
Cole Field House
2006 NCAA Division I women's basketball tournament

External links 
 
 Maryland Talk Show – Women's Basketball

References